Guns and Roses Volume. 2 is the second mixtape by grime crew Ruff Sqwad. It was released in October 2006 on the independent record label Ruff Sqwad Recordings. Like Guns and Roses Volume. 1, it is considered one of the best mixtapes to emerge from the grime scene.

Track listing

All Lyrics are by the seven members of Ruff Sqwad: Tinchy Stryder, Dirty Danger, Slix, Rapid, Shifty Rydos, Fuda Guy & DJ Scholar.
 All 23 tracks are produced by Ruff Sqwad members: Prince Rapid & David "Dirty Danger" Nkrumah

References

External links
 Ruff Sqwad - Guns And Roses Volume 2. Grimepedia.

2006 albums
Ruff Sqwad albums
Self-released albums